The 1964 Nippon Professional Baseball season was the 15th season of operation of Nippon Professional Baseball (NPB).

Regular season

Standings

Postseason

Japan Series

League leaders

Central League

Pacific League

Awards
Most Valuable Player
Sadaharu Oh, Yomiuri Giants (CL)
Joe Stanka, Nankai Hawks (PL)
Rookie of the Year
Shigeyuki Takahashi, Taiyo Whales (CL)
No PL recipient
Eiji Sawamura Award
Gene Bacque, Hanshin Tigers (CL)

See also
1964 Major League Baseball season

References